Petrovići is a village in Bosnia and Herzegovina. According to the 1991 census, the village is located in the municipality of Istočno Novo Sarajevo, Republika Srpska, Bosnia and Herzegovina.

Notable people
Dragan Škrba

References

Populated places in Istočno Novo Sarajevo
Villages in Republika Srpska